Caprotti is an Italian surname.

Notable people include:
 Arturo Caprotti (1881-1938), Italian architect and engineer who invented the Caprotti valve gear
 Bernardo Caprotti (1925-2016), Italian billionaire and owner of Esselunga grocery store chain
 Capriotti's, an American restaurant

See also
 Carotti, a surname